Christian de Jesús Bermúdez Gutiérrez (born 26 April 1987), also known as El Hobbit, is a Mexican professional footballer who plays as a midfielder.

Club career
Bermúdez has had a previous stint with Atlante from 2006 to 20011. He can play as a forward and a midfielder. He is known as "The Hobbit" because of his short stature.

On 18 December 2013 Bermúdez was transferred to Querétaro FC.

On 4 June 2014 Bermudez was transferred to Chiapas during the Apertura 2014 Mexican draft.

He played with Atlético Veracruz of the Liga de Balompié Mexicano during the league's inaugural season, leading them to a runners-up finish after losing to Chapulineros de Oaxaca in the finals.

International career
During the 2011 CONCACAF Gold Cup, Bermúdez, and four other members of the Mexico National Team, tested positive for the banned substance of Clenbuterol and were withdrawn from the team's tournament squad. However, all players were exonerated as FIFA determined that the accused had accidentally ingested the banned substance through contaminated meat that had been served during a pre-tournament training camp.

However, World Anti-Doping Agency appealed to the Court of Arbitration for Sport to request a ban. But on 12 October 2011 WADA withdrew this request after the full file was available for them.

Career statistics

International

Honours
Atlante
Mexican Primera División: Apertura 2007
Liga de Expansión MX: Apertura 2021, Apertura 2022
Campeón de Campeones: 2022
CONCACAF Champions League: 2008–09

América
Liga MX: Clausura 2013

Puebla
Supercopa MX: 2015

Tapachula:
Ascenso MX: Clausura 2018

Mexico
CONCACAF Gold Cup: 2011

References

External links
 
 
 

1987 births
Living people
People from Nezahualcóyotl
Footballers from the State of Mexico
Association football forwards
Mexico youth international footballers
Mexico under-20 international footballers
Mexico international footballers
2011 CONCACAF Gold Cup players
CONCACAF Gold Cup-winning players
Atlante F.C. footballers
Club América footballers
Querétaro F.C. footballers
Chiapas F.C. footballers
Club Puebla players
Cafetaleros de Chiapas footballers
Liga MX players
Liga de Balompié Mexicano players
Mexican footballers